Herschel is a settlement in Joe Gqabi District Municipality in the Eastern Cape province of South Africa.

Founded in 1879, it was named after the astronomer Sir John Herschel who worked in the Cape Colony from 1834 to 1838, making observations of Halley's Comet amongst his other astronomical work.

References 

Populated places in the Senqu Local Municipality
Populated places established in 1879